Mohammed Babkr Al-Khojali (born 15 January 1973) is a Saudi Arabian football goalkeeper. He played most of his career for Al-Nassr.

Al-Khojali played for the Saudi Arabia national football team and participated in the 2002 FIFA World Cup.

References
- English

External links

1973 births
Living people
Saudi Arabian footballers
Saudi Arabia international footballers
2002 FIFA World Cup players
2000 AFC Asian Cup players
Association football goalkeepers
Al Nassr FC players
Sdoos Club players
Al-Raed FC players
Al-Fayha FC players
Saudi First Division League players
Saudi Professional League players